The 2002–03 Marquette Golden Eagles men's basketball team represented Marquette University in NCAA Division I competition in the 2002–03 season. The Golden Eagles, coached by Tom Crean, were then a member of Conference USA; they did not join their current conference, the Big East, until the 2005–06 season.

Since their national championship in 1977, this is Marquette's sole Final Four appearance.

Roster

Schedule

|-
!colspan=9 style=| C-USA Tournament

|-
!colspan=9 style=| NCAA tournament

Rankings

Awards and honors
Dwyane Wade, C-USA Player of the year

Team players drafted into the NBA

References

Marquette Golden Eagles men's basketball seasons
Marquette
NCAA Division I men's basketball tournament Final Four seasons
Marquette
Marquette
Marquette